The 2003 Teen Choice Awards ceremony was held on August 2, 2003, at the Universal Amphitheatre, Universal City, California. The awards celebrate the year's achievements in music, film, television, sports, fashion, comedy, video games, and the Internet, and were voted on by viewers living in the US, aged 13 and over through various social media sites. The event was hosted by David Spade with Kelly Clarkson, Evanescence, and The Donnas as performers.

Performers
Kelly Clarkson – "Low"
Evanescence – "Going Under"
The Donnas – "Too Bad About Your Girl"

Presenters

 Jessica Alba
 Alexis Bledel
 Amanda Bynes
 Daveigh Chase
 JC Chasez
 Kaley Cuoco
 Jamie Lee Curtis
 Amy Davidson
 Dakota Fanning
 Justin Guarini
 Dwayne "The Rock" Johnson
 Nick Lachey
 Lil' Romeo
 Tara Lipinski
 Lindsay Lohan
 Alyssa Milano
 Brittany Murphy
 Jared Padalecki
 Queen Latifah
 Raven-Symoné
 John Ritter
 Ashlee Simpson
 Jessica Simpson
 Brittany Snow
 Martin Spanjers
 Britney Spears
 Wilmer Valderrama
 Emily VanCamp
 Alexa Vega
 Milo Ventimiglia

Winners and nominees
Winners are listed first and highlighted in bold text.

Movies
References:

Television

Music

Miscellaneous

References

2003
2003 awards
2003 in American music
2003 in Los Angeles